Spigučiai (formerly ) is a village in Kėdainiai district municipality, in Kaunas County, in central Lithuania. According to the 2011 census, the village has a population of 1 person. It is located 2 km from Surviliškis, by the regional road  Kėdainiai-Krekenava-Panevėžys.

Demography

References

Villages in Kaunas County
Kėdainiai District Municipality